The Fifth Street Towers is a complex of two buildings in Minneapolis, Minnesota.

At one time MAIR Holdings had its headquarters in Suite 1360 of Fifth Street Towers II.

It was purchased in 2007 by a UK-based company, StratREAL for $294 million on behalf of an unnamed client but sold in May 2012 for $110 million following a mortgage default by the borrower. The borrower was Interventure Capital Group, acting on behalf of Prince Abdul Aziz bin Fahd, youngest son of the late King Fahd of Saudi Arabia

See also

List of tallest buildings in Minneapolis

References

External links
Fifth Street Towers
Emporis

Skyscraper office buildings in Minneapolis
Buildings and structures completed in 1987
Office buildings completed in 1988
Twin towers
1987 establishments in Minnesota